Mikhail Aleksandrovich Zhabkin (born 1 March 1994) is a Russian football player.

Club career
He made his debut in the Russian Second Division for FC Volgar-Astrakhan Astrakhan on 15 April 2013 in a game against FC Olimpia Volgograd.
 
He made his Russian Football National League debut for FC Volgar Astrakhan on 5 October 2014 in a game against FC SKA-Energiya Khabarovsk.

Honours

Individual 
CIS Cup top goalscorer: 2016

References

External links
 
 

1994 births
Living people
Russian footballers
Russia youth international footballers
Russia under-21 international footballers
Association football forwards
Association football midfielders
FC Dynamo Moscow reserves players
FC Volgar Astrakhan players
FC Spartak Vladikavkaz players
Russian First League players
Russian Second League players
Armenian First League players
Russian expatriate footballers
Expatriate footballers in Armenia
Russian expatriate sportspeople in Armenia